Hesperia juba, the Juba skipper, Yuba skipper, or jagged-border skipper, is a butterfly of the family Hesperiidae. It is found in North America from British Columbia, south to southern California, east to Montana, Wyoming, Colorado, and north-western New Mexico.

The wingspan is 32–42 mm. There are two generations per year with adults on wing from May to June and again from August to September.

The larvae feed on Deschampsia elongata, Stipa, Bromus rubens, and Poa pratensis. Adults feed on flower nectar from various flowers, including rabbitbrush.

External links
Juba Skipper, Butterflies and Moths of North America

Hesperia (butterfly)
Butterflies described in 1872
Butterflies of North America
Taxa named by Samuel Hubbard Scudder